Henriette Pinson was a French film editor active from the 1920s through the 1940s.

Selected filmography 

 Le brigand gentilhomme (1943)
 Dernière aventure (1942)
 Le fraudeur (1937)
 Misdeal (1928)
 Napoleon (1927) (associate editor)

References

External links 

 

French film editors
French women film editors
Year of birth missing
Year of death missing